Bobbington is a village and civil parish in the South Staffordshire district of Staffordshire, England, about  west of Wombourne.  According to the 2001 census it had a population of 506, increasing to 588 at the 2011 Census.

On the 12 November 1943 a Royal Air Force, Handley Page Halifax Mk II (BB326) crashed shortly after taking off from Bobbington airfield due a mechanical failure, killing seven of the eight crew.<reg>http://www.rafcommands.com/database/serials/details.php?uniq=BB326</ref>

In recent years Bobbington has seen favour in the commuter culture being roughly equidistant from many of the region's business centres Wolverhampton Dudley, Stourbridge and Bridgnorth.

Schools 
 Corbett Primary School

See also
Listed buildings in Bobbington

References

External links 

Bobbington Parish Council
Halfpenny Green Vineyard
Wolverhampton Halfpenny Green Airport

Villages in Staffordshire
South Staffordshire District
Aviation accidents and incidents locations in England